Zapadny is a settlement in the urban okrug of Maykop, Russia. The population was 3430 as of 2018. There are 45 streets.

Geography 
The settlement is located near Maykop.

Ethnicity 
The settlement is inhabited by Circassians and Russians.

References 

Rural localities in Maykop Federal City